Isabelle Lafaye Marziou (born 9 July 1963) is a French para table tennis player who plays in international level in both singles and team events. Lafaye is a four time Paralympic champion and World champion and is a seven time European champion in para table tennis. She is married to sports photographer Gaël Marziou.

References

External links
 
 
 

1963 births
Living people
Paralympic table tennis players of France
Table tennis players at the 1996 Summer Paralympics
Table tennis players at the 2000 Summer Paralympics
Table tennis players at the 2004 Summer Paralympics
Table tennis players at the 2008 Summer Paralympics
Table tennis players at the 2012 Summer Paralympics
Table tennis players at the 2016 Summer Paralympics
Medalists at the 1996 Summer Paralympics
Medalists at the 2000 Summer Paralympics
Medalists at the 2004 Summer Paralympics
Medalists at the 2008 Summer Paralympics
Medalists at the 2012 Summer Paralympics
French female table tennis players
Paralympic medalists in table tennis
Paralympic gold medalists for France
Paralympic silver medalists for France
Paralympic bronze medalists for France
Table tennis players at the 2020 Summer Paralympics
20th-century French women
21st-century French women